Epworth Hall is a historic assembly hall located in Castile township in Wyoming County, New York. It was built in 1892 in the Colonial Revival style and is the largest of three such halls on the grounds of the Silver Lake Institute, a Methodist-affiliated camp facility established in 1873.  The two story, 100 feet by 50 feet, multi-purpose building exhibits elements of the Akron Plan in its interior layout.

It was listed on the National Register of Historic Places in 2000.

Gallery

References

External links

Epworth Hall - Perry, New York - U.S. National Register of Historic Places on Waymarking.com

Event venues on the National Register of Historic Places in New York (state)
Cultural infrastructure completed in 1892
Colonial Revival architecture in New York (state)
Buildings and structures in Wyoming County, New York
National Register of Historic Places in Wyoming County, New York